David Merlini is a Hungarian-Italian escape artist, and World Record holder, described by Expo 2015 as the world's most famous escapologist, currently serving as Director of The House of Houdini, the only Houdini museum in Europe.

Merlini's signature performances had been broadcast live in some of the most relevant television networks worldwide.

Early life and career
His mother is Hungarian and his father is Italian. He was raised in Italy, where he moved with his family from Hungary at the age of 4.

Around the age of 4, Merlini became interested in locks and handcuffs. As a child, he was given a magic trick, which founded his career.  Around 13, Merlini attended night school at Turin's Circolo Amici della Magia, an illusionist school. When he was 17, he returned to Hungary, the country he regards as his homeland. Merlini cited Harry Houdini, who had also been born in Hungary, as a major source of inspiration.

Milestones of his career

1995
At Sziget'95 (now called the Sziget Festival), Merlini was strapped in a straitjacket,  and was tied to a flaming rope by his feet. His aim was to escape from the rope and descend 20 meters to the platform below with a safety line.

1996
Merlini was locked and in a perforated steel box, after being chained and padlocked. The box was lowered into the Danube from the Chain Bridge.

1997
Attempts to recreate Houdini's famed Chinese Water Torture Cell, Handcuffed by five sets of regulation police handcuffs, locked with 60 pounds of chains, and padlocked in a metal cage, Merlini was lowered into a transparent tank of water, live at eurovision television programme Jeux Sans Frontieres.

1998
Handcuffed to the steering wheel of a Mercedes 500, doors are welded shut, the car is set on fire and lifted up to a height of 100 ft. before being released free fall.

1999
Strapped in a regulations straitjacket on the main stage of Sziget Festival, he is lifted upside down several hundred feet in the air, before proceeding to escape.

2000
Strapped in a special underwater straitjacket, Merlini's ankles are secured by handcuffs, padlocks and massive lead weights. He jumps into the giant transparent tank of water along with six tiger sharks, spending a total of 2 minutes and 30 seconds at a depth of 5 meters.

The New Generation Performances

2001
The stunt named Hyberna sees Merlini strapped in a regulation straitjacket, welded in a steel reinforced glass container filled with water, and set to freeze in a refrigeration cell on Heroe's Square, in Budapest.
At the end of the 33 hours process, the one ton ice block is melted with flame throwers. The show is witnessed live by a crowd of more than 10,000 and on live television broadcast.

2002
As part of a live segment for MTV show The Fridge. Strapped in a regulation straitjacket, his ankles are padlocked and handcuffed to lead weights, before jumping in the Baltic Sea in --Karlskrona, Sweden.

2003
Handcuffed to a metal cross, Merlini is lowered upside down in a tank of water set on fire, as part of a segment for MTV show The Fridge.

2004
As part of the performance named "The Breakthrough", viewed by two million people on live television, and a large crowd on the banks of the river, Merlini was buried up to his neck in 3.5 tons of freshly set concrete after which the concrete cube was lowered by crane to the bottom of the Danube river.

2005
Merlini is locked in a capsule on top of the largest non governmental, non military missile ever built, and launched to an altitude of 6,000 feet from the Shipyard Island (Hajógyári Island), as part of the stunt named The Countdown, witnessed live by a crowd of thousands, and broadcast live by Viasat.

2006
Publishes his first autobiographic book titled "Szabadíts ki!' (Free me!)

2007
Merlini received the "Best Escape Artist" award at the 2007 World Magic Awards in Los Angeles.

2008
Merlini set the breath-holding world record in Cannes, France, at the annual trade show MIPCOM after holding his breath for 20 minutes and 39 seconds. He received a certificate from Guinness World Records for "The record for the longest time that someone has held their breath underwater".

2009
Breaks the world record for the longest time underwater on the starting grid of the Formula 1 World Championship in Bahrain, before the start of the race. The event was covered live worldwide. The new world record stands at 21 minutes and 29 seconds.

2010
Merlini is on tour. Performing on 17 different venues, presenting his signature escapes.

2011
Breaks the breath-holding world record in Baofeng lake, Hunan, China.

2012
Plays chess upside down with chess World Champion Susan Polgár, after successfully escaping a regulation straitjacket.

2013
Merlini consulted for the Houdini miniseries as magical and escape advisor, training actor Adrien Brody, who played the role of Houdini, how to escape from handcuffs while holding his breath.

2014
Merlini was set on fire during his "Witch trial" stunt. Tied at the stake with ropes, and soaked with flammable material, he had to escape before the protective coating on his skin would volatilize.

2015
Merlini presented "Houdini in Milano", a live theatrical show featuring real escapes, for the closing ceremony of Expo 2015 at the Auditorium in Milan, Italy.

2016
Merlini opened The House of Houdini, presenting the largest permanent collection of original Houdini artifacts in Europe.  Its artifacts were previewed at Budapest's National Széchényi Library.  The museum's collection includes original Houdini memorabilia: e.g., handcuffs, personal correspondence, and "precious artifacts."  A bible one owned by Houdini is part of the collection.    It also includes original props from the latest "HOUDINI" film  Oxygen (1999), which featured Adrien Brody, an Oscar winner, and the later miniseries.

Accidents and injuries
In 2008 During a World Record attempt in Cannes, France, Merlini's assistants smash the giant water tank in order to rescue him, resulting in an injured arm caused by broken glass .

In 2014 he presents Hyberna, the ice escape in Italy on Canale 5. During the escape, the 1 ton ice block breaks, causing a fracture of Merlini's tibia and fibula. Merlini calmly thanks the audience for the support, before being rushed to the hospital. Few weeks later, he performs a new underwater escape, the "upper body escape", where only his head and torso is submerged underwater, due to the cast on his leg.

References

External links
 

Living people
Entertainers from Budapest
Escapologists
Year of birth missing (living people)